Muktagacha is an upazila of Mymensingh District in the Division of Mymensingh, Bangladesh. It is known for sweets which are made here, called "Monda". It is also known for the Rajbari of Brahmin family (a Zamindar's residence) which is currently used as an educational institute, Shahid Shrity College.

Etymology
The previous name of Muktagacha was Binodbari. When the Zamindars (kings) arrived from Natore, an inhabitant of the town, Muktaram Karmakar, presented them with a gold lamp-stand, locally called Gacha. This pleased the Zamindars. They wanted to acknowledge the present and show respect to Muktaram, so they renamed the town to Muktagacha.

Geography
It has a total area of 314.71 km2. It is bounded by Mymensingh sadar and Jamalpur sadar upazilas on the north, Fulbaria upazila on the south, Mymensingh Sadar and Fulbaria upazilas on the east, Madhupur and Jamalpur Sadar upazilas on the west.

Demographics

According to the 2011 Bangladesh census, Muktagacha Upazila had 96,657 households and a population of 415,473, 12.0% of whom lived in urban areas. 11.6% of the population was under the age of 5. The literacy rate (age 7 and over) was 43.5%, compared to the national average of 51.8%.

Arts and culture 

Muktagacha has always been a place to nourish the various cultural activities. The Zaminders of Muktagacha were always conscious of cultural activities. Raja Jagat Kishore Acharya Choudhury was a patron of culture. He brought cultural people like Ustad Alauddin Khan, Hafiz Ali Khan, Dabir Khan and others to Muktagacha. People here practice Rabindra Sangeet, Nazrul Sangeet, Kirtan, Lalon Geeti etc.  In addition, various cultural activities are held around the year. The artist association of Muktagacha is Aymon Tirer Shillpy Somaj' according to the name of Aymon River.

Administration
Muktagachha Thana was formed in 1961 and it was turned into an upazila in 1983. Muktagachha Municipality was formed in 1875.

Muktagacha Upazila is divided into Muktagacha Municipality and ten union parishads: Basati, Borogram, Daogaon, Dulla, Ghoga, Kashimpur, Kheruajani, Kumargata, Mankon, and Tarati. The union parishads are subdivided into 261 mauzas and 283 villages.

Muktagacha Municipality is subdivided into 9 wards and 21 mahallas.

 Religious activities 
Muktagacha has a long tradition of being a peaceful land decorated with religious harmony. Both the Hindus and Muslims are of brotherly nature and live peacefully together. Eid is celebrated with much grandeur and devotion. In this day, not only the Muslims visit each other's home but also the Hindus also visit Muslim homes as well. People share many food items and gifts to mark the occasion. Many fairs, locally called Mela'', are held for weeks.  Durga Puja is the main religious festival of the Hindu community here. During Durga Puja the whole town takes a festive look. People of all community enjoy the Puja holiday. Devotees and visitors go from one pandal to another to see the idols of Goddess Durga. On the day of Bijoyadashami, the idols are carried out in long processions and then immersed into nearby water bodies. Besides these all other religious activities are peacefully observed. There is a 200-year-old twin Shiva Temple just outside the zamindar-house where Durga Puja is also celebrated.

Major zamindaris of Mymensingh
Susanga (Maharaja) (3rd in the Order of Precedence in the Government House of Calcutta before 1947)
Muktagagacha (also called Mymensingh) (Maharaja)
Ramgopalpur(raja)
Ratanpur (nawab)
Gouripur (Babu)
Kalipur (Babu)
Malotipur (Babu)

Schools and colleges
Schools
 Muktagacha RK Govt. High School
 NN Girls High School
 Nabarun Bidyaniketan
 Hamida Sultana Girls High School
 Montola High School
 Armed Batalian High School
 Gabtali High School
Chachua High School
Bahenga Govt. Primary School
Mogaltula Secondary School
 Colleges
 Govt. Shahid Smriti College
 Muktagacha Mahabidyaloy
 Hazi Kashem Ali Degree College 
 Gabtali Degree College
 Mymensingh Physical Education College

Banks in Muktagacha
 Bank Asia Limited
 Sonali Bank Limited
 Rupali Bank Limited
 Janata Bank Limited
 Agrani Bank Limited
 Pubali Bank Limited
 National Bank Limited
 Brac Bank Limited
 Southeast Bank Limited
 Islami Bank Limited
 Bangladesh Krishi Bank Limited
 Dutch Bangla Bank Limited
 Karmasangsthan Bank
 Grameen Bank

See also
Upazilas of Bangladesh
Muktagachar monda

Districts of Bangladesh
Divisions of Bangladesh

External links

References

Upazilas of Mymensingh District